Eduardo Moreno (born 28 June 1944) is a Mexican former swimmer. He competed in two events at the 1968 Summer Olympics.

References

External links
 

1944 births
Living people
Mexican male swimmers
Olympic swimmers of Mexico
Swimmers at the 1968 Summer Olympics
Swimmers from Mexico City